Governor Bond State Memorial is a granite monument that marks the grave of Shadrach Bond, the first governor of Illinois after it became a state in 1818.  Born in Maryland, Bond settled in Monroe County, Illinois in 1794, and served as an Illinois Territory delegate to the U.S. House of Representatives from 1812 to 1814.  Erected in 1883, the monument is styled as an obelisk and is maintained by the Illinois Historic Preservation Agency as a state historic site.  The monument is located in Evergreen Cemetery, Illinois Route 3 North, in Chester, Illinois, Randolph County, US.

In September 2008, Governor Bond's obelisk – the tallest and most prominent monument in the cemetery – was toppled by Hurricane Ike.

References

External links
 Governor Bond State Memorial
 Governor Bond Memorial – local guide with photos
 Evergreen Cemetery: Shadrach Bond – photo of monument after the storm

Illinois State Historic Sites
Monuments and memorials in Illinois
Buildings and structures in Randolph County, Illinois
Tourist attractions in Randolph County, Illinois
1883 sculptures
Granite sculptures in Illinois
1883 establishments in Illinois